Tauheed K. Epps (born September 12, 1977), known professionally as 2 Chainz (formerly Tity Boi), is an American rapper. Born and raised in College Park, Georgia, he initially gained recognition as one-half of the Southern hip hop duo Playaz Circle, alongside longtime friend and fellow rapper Earl "Dolla Boy" Conyers. The duo was signed to Georgia-based rapper Ludacris' Disturbing tha Peace label, and are best known for their 2007 debut single "Duffle Bag Boy" (featuring Lil Wayne).

In February 2012, Epps signed a solo record deal with Def Jam Recordings, an imprint of Universal Music Group. The following August, he released his debut studio album Based on a T.R.U. Story on August 14, 2012, to commercial success despite mixed reviews. The album spawned three successful singles: "No Lie" (featuring Drake), "Birthday Song" (featuring Kanye West), and "I'm Different", all of which charted in the top 50 of the Billboard Hot 100 and were certified Gold or higher by the RIAA, along with the album being certified Gold. His second studio album B.O.A.T.S. II: Me Time was released on September 11, 2013; supported by the lead single "Feds Watching" (featuring Pharrell Williams). Epps would subsequently release the albums ColleGrove (2016), Pretty Girls Like Trap Music (2017), Rap or Go to the League (2019), So Help Me God! (2020), and Dope Don't Sell Itself (2022) before parting ways with Def Jam in 2022.

Epps began working with TV network Viceland on a show called Most Expensivest, which debuted on November 15, 2017, and aired for three seasons.

Early life
2 Chainz was born Tauheed Epps in College Park, Georgia. He attended North Clayton High School, where he played basketball and graduated second in his class. While in high school, he dealt marijuana and was arrested for felony cocaine possession when he was 15 years old.

College basketball career
He later attended Alabama State University on a scholarship, and played on its basketball team from 1995 to 1997.

When asked by Rolling Stone about longstanding rumors that he had graduated from Alabama State with a 4.0 GPA, which had been widely reported on many sources including Wikipedia, 2 Chainz said: "Don't believe anything on Wack-ipedia. There's a lot of false stuff on there, to the point that every time I try to fix one thing, something else comes out." In fact, he transferred to Virginia State University due to circumstances he was reluctant to speak about. "I got into some trouble, went somewhere else, and came back. But I graduated, and that's that. That was then," he said.

Statistics

Musical career

1997–2010: Playaz Circle and Disturbing tha Peace
Epps formed the hip hop duo Playaz Circle (the word "Playaz" being a backronym for "Preparing Legal Assets for Years from A to Z") in College Park, Georgia in 1997, with his high school friend Earl Conyers (known as Dolla Boy), while Epps adopted "Tity Boi" as his moniker. Following the release of an independent album titled United We Stand, United We Fall (2002), the duo was introduced to fellow Atlanta rapper Ludacris when he moved into their College Park apartment complex while he was acting as a DJ. After taking interest in Playaz Circle, Ludacris began to record several songs with the group, playing some of them on his radio station.

Ludacris soon became one of the highest-selling rappers in the Southern United States. After hearing of their situation, Ludacris requested of Epps that the duo join his newly formed record label Disturbing Tha Peace, a subsidiary of Def Jam Recordings. Epps agreed to sign, although Conyers did not officially join the label until his mother regained her health a year after the initial signing.

The duo's debut album Supply & Demand, was released on October 30, 2007. The lead single and the duo's debut single, "Duffle Bag Boy", became an urban hit single. The song features Lil Wayne, and was performed by the duo at the BET Hip Hop Awards. The duo released its second studio album Flight 360: The Takeoff, on September 29, 2009. In January 2010, Playaz Circle filmed a music video for the single "Big Dawg" featuring Lil Wayne and Birdman at Studio Space Atlanta. Shortly afterwards, Epps left Disturbing tha Peace, a move he claimed was taken in order to advance his career. Although Ludacris was initially reluctant to allow Epps to leave the label (as he felt Epps could still prove financially successful), he eventually accepted the decision.

2011–12: Name change and Based on a T.R.U. Story
Epp's has sometimes faced criticism of sexism for his original pseudonym "Tity Boi", although he has repeatedly denied such accusations. In early 2011, he decided to change his stage name to "2 Chainz," as he perceived it to be more "family friendly." Following the name change, Epps released a mixtape titled T.R.U. REALigion, which became his first mixtape to appear on the music charts, peaking at number 58 on the US Billboard Top R&B/Hip-Hop Albums chart. Since the success of the mixtape, Epps has made numerous guest appearances on tracks by prominent recording artists such as Kanye West ("Mercy") and Nicki Minaj ("Beez in the Trap").

On March 24, 2012, Epps announced his debut studio album, whose title he had changed to Based on a T.R.U. Story from its original title of T.R.U. to My REALigion, which was set for an August 14, 2012, release date. The album's lead single, "No Lie," featured Canadian rapper Drake, and was released on May 8, 2012. On May 11, it was under speculation that Epps had signed with Kanye West's GOOD Music label, after West tweeted: "2 Chainz is charging 100k for a verse now cause he's G.O.O.D!!!!!" However, Epps later denied those rumors, saying: "He just said I'm good, like I'm ill. But we was talking and I think I was jeopardizing my brand sometimes by doing the homeboy special. So I think he felt like we should just put that out there that we ain't doing no more of that." On May 30, 2012, Ciara revealed 2 Chainz was featured on "Sweat," the intended first single from her fifth studio album, One Woman Army.

Based on a T.R.U. Story debuted at number one on the US Billboard 200, selling 147,000 copies in its first week. The album was met with mixed reviews, earning a score of 55 on metacritic. As of September 23, 2012, the album sold 288,000 copies in the United States. That September, Epps performed at the 2012 MTV Video Music Awards, alongside longtime friend Lil Wayne. After the release of his debut, Based on a T.R.U. Story, Epps made momentous strides. He facilitated his first solo worldwide tour, selling out most of its dates; he was nominated for over 13 BET Hip Hop Awards, bringing home four such trophies; he earned The Source Magazine's "Man of the Year" award; he released a collaborative endeavor with ADIDAS, and later Beats By Dre; and he was nominated for three Grammy Awards, including Best Rap Album.

2012–15: B.O.A.T.S. II: Me Time and ColleGrove

In late 2012, Epps stated that once he completed the B.O.A.T.S. concert tour, he would reenter the studio. In November 2012, he revealed he was three songs deep into his second studio album. The album's estimated release date was April 2013. The rapper made a guest appearance on NBC's Law & Order: Special Victims Unit in an episode that aired May 8, 2013. He also appeared as himself in the second season (episode 16, titled "...And Just Plane Magic") of the CBS sitcom 2 Broke Girls, where he traveled on the same private planes as the two main characters. On May 23, 2013, he announced that his second studio album B.O.A.T.S. II: Me Time would be released on September 10, 2013. On June 2, 2013, Epps premiered the first single from the album, titled "Feds Watching," at the Hot 97's Summer Jam. The song featured Pharrell Williams, and it was recorded on 2013 Grammy Awards night. On June 15, Epps announced the title of his second album would be B.O.A.T.S. II: Me Time. The album was released on Def Jam Recordings on September 10, 2013.

B.O.A.T.S. II: Me Time featured guest appearances from Pharrell Williams, Fergie, Drake, Lil Wayne, Pusha T, Mase, Chrisette Michele, Iamsu!, T-Pain, Dolla Boy, Rich Homie Quan, and Lloyd. The album's production was handled by Diplo, Mike WiLL Made It, Drumma Boy, J.U.S.T.I.C.E. League, Mannie Fresh, Wonder Arillo, Da Honorable C-Note and DJ Toomp. It was supported by the single "Used 2," along with the promotional singles "Where U Been?" and "Netflix." The album was met with generally positive reviews from music critics. It also fared decently commercially, debuting at number three on the US Billboard 200, and number two on the Top R&B/Hip-Hop Albums chart, selling 63,000 copies in its first week.

On October 23, 2013, Epps revealed that he had begun working on his third studio album immediately following the release of B.O.A.T.S. II. He also stated he had the first single from his third album ready for release and that he still wanted to get Jay-Z featured on the album. In November 2015, 2 Chainz revealed that he was releasing a joint album with Lil Wayne, titled ColleGrove. On May 5, 2014, Epps released a brand new EP titled FreeBase for free digital download. It included seven songs and included features from Lil Boosie, A$AP Rocky, Rick Ross, and more. The EP earned over 200,000 downloads. In January 2014 Epps released a promotional single titled "I'm a Dog."

2016–2019: Pretty Girls Like Trap Music and Rap or Go to the League

On January 27, 2016, Epps released an EP titled Felt Like Cappin. It was released via online streaming sites and iTunes. The EP was promoted by the single "Back On That Bullshit" featuring Lil Wayne.

Epps began 2016 with the March release of a 12-record collaborative album with rapper Lil Wayne titled ColleGrove, which was intended to be the debut album between 2 Chainz and Lil Wayne. However, Wayne's ongoing lawsuit with Cash Money Records prevented Wayne from being a primary artist on the album. Epps appears as the primary artist on the album with eight tracks featuring Lil Wayne. The album features prominent producers such as Honorable C.N.O.T.E., Mike Will Made It, Zaytoven, TM88, Metro Boomin, London on da Track, and more. ColleGrove received decent reviews from critics and fans.

Epps continued his work in 2016 with the August 5 release of mixtape Daniel Son: Necklace Don, a 9-track mixtape that Epps released independently. The mixtape originally featured Drake and YFN Lucci on it, but Epps chose to move the song "Big Amount ft. Drake" to the 2017 studio album Pretty Girls Like Trap Music because of its mass appeal on the mixtape and star power performance. Daniel Son: Necklace Don received a 3-out-of-5-star review from XXL magazine.

2016 was wrapped up by Epps's third mixtape, titled Hibachi for Lunch, which was released October 28. The 7-track mixtape originally featured Quavo, Gucci Mane, Ty Dolla Sign, and Future. However, the song "Good Drank ft. Quavo and Gucci Mane" was moved to Pretty Girls Like Trap Music. Notable production was done by Mike Will Made It, K Swisha, and Buddah Bless.

In 2017, Epps released his fourth studio album titled Pretty Girls Like Trap Music on June 16 on Def Jam Recordings. The album featured Travis Scott, Nicki Minaj, Swae Lee, Migos, Jhene Aiko, Pharrell Williams, and more. Album production was done by Mike Will Made It, Buddah Bless, Mike Dean, Murda Beatz, and more. The album was supported by three official singles: "Good Drank", "It's a Vibe," and "4 AM". The album was also supported by a nationwide concert tour, as well as several pop-up shops in the US.[1] [2] 2 Chainz alluded to the album showing "growth and maturation." He stated the content would maintain its edginess while also elevating trap music to a point where everyone could appreciate it. Pretty Girls Like Trap Music received widespread critical acclaim, with most critics citing the album as his best album yet.

On November 15, 2017, the first episode of Most Expensivest aired on the TV network Viceland. The show focused on 2 Chainz visiting different locations offering the "most expensivest" goods and services. Each show covers a particular theme, with shows ranging from personal health to extravagant indulgences. The show offered a unique insight into products and services that have been created with the explicit intent on being exclusive and expensive. 2 Chainz offered a unique and often humorous insight into the products, especially the ones that he personally found to be either amazing or ridiculous. The show was renewed for a 20-episode third season, which aired in early 2019.

The Play Don't Care Who Makes was the fourth EP released by Epps on February 8, 2018, by Def Jam Recordings. The EP was composed of four songs, one of which featured appearances from YG and Offset on the song "PROUD". Production was done by Minus, June James, Nonstop, Streetrunner, and more.

On February 19, 2018, Epps announced his new album Rap or Go to the League, which was set to be released during 2018. However, the album was released on March 1, 2019. On March 26, 2020, 2 Chainz confirmed that ColleGrove 2, a sequel of 2016's ColleGrove, would be released later in 2020.

2020–present: So Help Me God and Dope Don't Sell Itself
In August 2020, following his Verzuz battle with Rick Ross, 2 Chainz announced that his upcoming sixth album would be titled So Help Me God! The album was initially scheduled for release on September 25, 2020. However, in the week of its planned release, it was delayed because of sample clearances. 2 Chainz said, "It should be another couple weeks". It was then announced for release on November 13, 2020, and was preceded by the release of the single "Quarantine Thick", which featured Mulatto.

On September 24, 2020, 2 Chainz played against Big Boi and his family on the season premiere of the reality game show Celebrity Family Feud.

On August 3, 2021, 2 Chainz announced that his seventh album would be his last trap album, titled Dope Don't Sell Itself.

Personal life
Epps has two daughters, Heaven, born on July 26, 2008; and Harmony, born on October 20, 2012. On October 14, 2015, 2 Chainz welcomed his third child, a baby boy named Halo. On August 18, 2018, Epps married his longtime girlfriend and mother of his three children: Kesha Ward.

Legal issues
At the age of 15, Epps was convicted of felony cocaine possession. On February 14, 2013, he was arrested in Maryland en route to a concert at UMES for marijuana possession. He was then cited and released.

On June 11, 2013, Epps was arrested while on board a departing flight at LAX airport for possession of a controlled substance after TSA agents found that his checked bag contained marijuana and promethazine. He was booked and charged with felony narcotics possession. Later that day he posted $10,000 bond and was released. He was due back in court on June 21, 2013.
Two days previous, he was reportedly robbed at gunpoint outside a medical marijuana dispensary in San Francisco.

Just before midnight on August 21, 2013, Epps' tour bus was pulled over in Oklahoma City, Oklahoma, because the passenger side taillights were out. The arresting officer reported that he smelled marijuana and saw smoke through the open door of the bus after he had stopped and pulled over the bus. The driver of the bus shut the door and told officers he was not authorized to allow them on the bus. The officer said the marijuana smell gave him probable cause to search, but the driver refused to open the door. After many attempts to enter, the bus was towed with the men still aboard to the police training center in Oklahoma City. Officers obtained a search warrant and the 10 men, including Epps, got off the bus. Police discovered two semi-automatic pistols and a 12-gauge pump shotgun, along with some prescription painkillers and marijuana residue, on the tour bus according to papers filed at Oklahoma County district Court.

Business ventures

In October 2016, Epps opened a line of hoodies called CEO Millionaires or Create Every Opportunity Millionaires. He also has his own line of sweaters called "Dabbing Sweaters."

On May 10, 2019, the Atlanta Hawks announced that 2 Chainz had acquired a minority ownership stake in the team's NBA G League affiliate, the College Park Skyhawks.

Discography

 Based on a T.R.U. Story (2012)
 B.O.A.T.S. II: Me Time (2013)
 ColleGrove (2016)
 Pretty Girls Like Trap Music (2017)
 Rap or Go to the League  (2019)
 So Help Me God! (2020)
 Dope Don't Sell Itself (2022)

The Real University

On January 6, 2015, 2 Chainz announced that he was starting his own independent record label "The Real University" (also known as "T.R.U."; or "The Real U"). The announcement also revealed that frequent collaborators Cap.1 & Skooly were signed. Additionally, they signed former Young Money artist Short Dawg, who is now known as Fresh. They also revealed they would be releasing their debut mixtape TRU Jack City on January 27, 2015. On October 4, 2019, 2 Chainz announced that T.R.U. had signed a partnership deal with Atlantic Records.

Artists
 2 Chainz
 Cap.1
 Skooly
 Fresh (formerly known as Short Dawg)
 C White

Discography

Awards and nominations

BET Awards

|-
| style="text-align:center;" rowspan="8"| 2013
| 2 Chainz
| Best Male Hip-Hop Artist
| 
|-
| rowspan="2"|"Mercy" (with Kanye West, Big Sean and Pusha T)
| Video of the Year
| 
|-
| rowspan="2"|Best Collaboration
| 
|-
| rowspan="2"|"No Lie" (with Drake)
| 
|-
| rowspan="2"|Video of the Year
| 
|-
| rowspan="3"|"Fuckin' Problems" (with A$AP Rocky, Drake and Kendrick Lamar)
| 
|-
| Best Collaboration
| 
|-
| Coca-Cola Viewer's Choice
| 
|-
| style="text-align:center;" | 2016
| rowspan="2"|2 Chainz & Lil Wayne
| rowspan="2"|Best Duo/Group
| 
|-
| style="text-align:center;" rowspan="2"| 2017
| 
|-
| "No Problem" (with Chance the Rapper and Lil Wayne)
| Best Collaboration
| 
|-

BET Hip Hop Awards

|-
|rowspan="10"|2012
|rowspan="4"|"Mercy" (with Kanye West, Big Sean and Pusha T)
|Reese's Perfect Combo Award (Best Collabo, Duo or Group)
|
|-
|Sweet 16: Best Featured Verse
|
|-
|Best Club Banger
|
|-
|rowspan="2"|Best Hip Hop Video
|
|-
|rowspan="2"|"No Lie" (featuring Drake)
|
|-
|People's Champ Award
|
|-
|rowspan="7"|Himself
|Rookie of the Year
|
|-
|Made You Look Award
|
|-
|Hustler of the Year
|
|-
|rowspan="2"|MVP of the Year
|
|-
|rowspan="7"|2013
|
|-
|Best Live Performer
|
|-
|Made You Look Award
|
|-
|rowspan="4"|"Fuckin' Problems"(with A$AP Rocky, Drake and Kendrick Lamar)
|Best Hip Hop Video
|
|-
|Reese's Perfect Combo Award (Best Collabo, Duo or Group)
|
|-
|Best Club Banger
|
|-
|People's Champ Award
|
|-
|rowspan="2"|2016
|"Watch Out"
|Best Hip Hop Video
|
|-
|"No Problem"
|Sweet 16: Best Featured Verse
|
|-
|}

Grammy Awards

|-
| style="text-align:center;" rowspan="3"| 2013
| Based on a T.R.U. Story
| Best Rap Album
| 
|-
| rowspan="2"| "Mercy" (with Kanye West, Big Sean and Pusha T)
| Best Rap Performance
| 
|-
| rowspan="3"| Best Rap Song
| 
|-
| style="text-align:center;"| 2014
| "Fuckin' Problems" (with ASAP Rocky, Drake and Kendrick Lamar)
| 
|-
| style="text-align:center;" rowspan="2"| 2017
| rowspan="2"| "No Problem" (with Chance the Rapper and Lil Wayne)
| 
|-
| Best Rap Performance
| 
|-

Soul Train Awards
 2012: Best Hip Hop Song of the Year: "Mercy" (with Kanye West, Big Sean, and Pusha T) (Won)
 2012: Best Hip Hop Song of the Year: "No Lie" (with Drake) (Nominated)

References

External links 

 
 

 
1977 births
Living people
20th-century American rappers
21st-century American rappers
Activists from Georgia (U.S. state)
African-American male rappers
African-American male songwriters
Alabama State Hornets basketball players
American businesspeople convicted of crimes
American cannabis activists
American chief executives in the media industry
American men's basketball players
American music industry executives
American people convicted of drug offenses
Basketball players from Georgia (U.S. state)
Businesspeople from Atlanta
Def Jam Recordings artists
Gangsta rappers
Hardcore hip hop artists
People from College Park, Georgia
Rappers from Atlanta
Songwriters from Georgia (U.S. state)
Southern hip hop musicians
Trap musicians